Macaretaera is a monotypic moth genus of the family Crambidae described by Edward Meyrick in 1886. It contains only one species, Macaretaera hesperis, described by the same author in the same year, which is found in India, Vietnam, Australia (Queensland), Papua New Guinea and on Fiji.

References

Spilomelinae
Taxa named by Edward Meyrick
Monotypic moth genera
Moths of Oceania
Moths of Asia
Crambidae genera